Ville Meskanen (born October 2, 1995) is a Finnish professional ice hockey player for SaiPa of the Finnish Liiga.

Playing career
Undrafted, Meskanen played as a junior within Ilves organization. After a successful Jr. A season Meskanen was signed to a one-year Liiga contract with Ilves on April 15, 2014.

Meskanen made his professional and Liiga debut playing with Ilves during the 2014–15 Liiga season. He played in a fourth line role against the Lahti Pelicans on October 8, 2014. He finished the campaign scoring 3 goals in 10 games while with the senior team.

In the 2017–18 season, Meskanen broke out offensively with Ilves, leading the club in scoring with 24 goals and 44 points in 48 games. He was signed to a two-year contract extension during the campaign on November 15, 2017.

On May 3, 2018, Meskanen, used an NHL-out clause in his contract with Ilves, in agreeing to terms with the New York Rangers of the National Hockey League (NHL).

After a successful first season in North America, posting 34 points in 70 games with the Rangers AHL affiliate, the Hartford Wolf Pack of the American Hockey League (AHL), Meskanen returned for his second season within the Rangers organization in the 2019–20 season.

Unable to replicate his offensive totals with the Wolf Pack, posting just four assists through 20 games, Meskanen opted to mutually terminate his contract with the New York Rangers on December 12, 2019. He returned to Finland to play with his original club, Ilves of the Liiga, agreeing to an optional three-year contract on December 13.

Career statistics

References

External links
 

1995 births
Living people
Finnish ice hockey right wingers
Hartford Wolf Pack players
Ilves players
KooKoo players
Lempäälän Kisa players
SaiPa players
Ice hockey people from Tampere